The Marais Poitevin or Poitevin Marsh is a large area of marshland in the former province of Poitou in western France.

It is a remnant of what was the former . The western zone near the sea (about two-thirds of the area) is called the "dry marsh" (or "dried marsh"). It is used for farming and livestock breeding. The eastern zone, called the "wet marsh", is a maze of islets crisscrossed by picturesque canals, primarily now a tourist destination for boating. It is nicknamed The Green Venice (la Venise Verte).

Overview
The Marais Poitevin is the most important area of angelica cultivation in France. Extending across three departments (Vendée, Deux-Sèvres, and Charente-Maritime), it is situated west of Niort, north of La Rochelle, and south of Fontenay-le-Comte.

In 1979 the Marais Poitevin was declared a Regional Natural Park, in an effort to help preserve it. The marsh lost that status in 1997, due to intensive agricultural development around the Marsh that endangered the unique character of the region. Only a core Interregional Park (Parc Interrégional du Marais poitevin) of  remains. Attempts to regain the full Park classification started in 2002, and supporters proposed a new charter in 2006. While this was accepted by the local authorities, it was rejected in late 2008 by the national government due to a perceived "juridical fragility".

Tourism includes boating in traditional barques, which is a form of punting. There are several piers, from which boats can be hired. The myriad canals have become covered in green duckweed (hence the Green Venice nickname). The drained marshland is home to a varied fauna.

Geology
The marsh developed above a limestone plateau, dating from the Jurassic period. This plateau covered much of the former province of Poitou. The Würm glaciation, c. 24,000–10,000 YBP, caused significant marine regression and the recovery of much river erosion (a watershed of c. 535,000 ha), thus exposing the marl-limestone formations. The villages of Maillezais, Saint-Michel-en-l'Herm, and Marans developed on such hillocks.

Gallery

See also

 Jean Hoeufft

References

Further reading
 "History of the Marais Poitevin" (from the Pliocene to 1979)

External links

  Tourism in the Marais Poitevin
  Parc naturel régional du Marais Poitevin
  Organisation for the defence of the Marais Poitevin
  A guide to punting on the Marais Poitevin (Venise Verte)
 Awarded "EDEN - European Destinations of Excellence" non traditional tourist destination 2010

Marshes of France
Polders
Landforms of Vendée
Landforms of Deux-Sèvres
Landforms of Charente-Maritime
Tourist attractions in Vendée